Heswall Dales is an area of some  of lowland heath situated close to Heswall on the Wirral Peninsula, England.

It is a Site of Special Scientific Interest and a Local Nature Reserve. Heswall Dales offers views of the Dee Estuary and over the River Dee the Clwydian Hills of Wales.

References

External links

 Metropolitan Borough of Wirral: Heswall Dales Local Nature Reserve

Parks and commons in the Metropolitan Borough of Wirral
Sites of Special Scientific Interest in Merseyside
Local Nature Reserves in Merseyside